Paul William Michael (born December 24, 1935) is a former American football guard who played college football for Ohio State and professional football in the National Football League (NFL) for the Pittsburgh Steelers in 1957. He appeared in three NFL games, two of them as a starter.

Early years
Michael was born in 1935 in Hamilton, Ohio, and attended Fairfield High School in Fairfield, Ohio. He then played college football at Ohio State.

Professional football
He was drafted by the Pittsburgh Steelers in the second round (16th overall pick) of the 1957 NFL Draft. He appeared in three games with the Steelers during the 1957 season, two of them as a starter.

References

1935 births
Living people
American football guards
Pittsburgh Steelers players
Ohio State Buckeyes football players
People from Hamilton, Ohio
Players of American football from Ohio